The Two-Headed Spy is a 1958 British spy thriller film directed by Andre DeToth and starring Jack Hawkins, Gia Scala, Erik Schumann, Donald Pleasance and Alexander Knox. The film, which has elements of film noir and is set in the Second World War, was based on a story by J. Alvin Kugelmass called Britain's Two-Headed Spy and is notable for having been scripted by blacklisted writers.

Plot
The story begins in 1939. Alex Schottland, a colonel in charge of supplies in the German Army, is a long-entrenched British agent planted toward the end of the First World War. He is growing weary of being a spy, but is urged to continue by his friend and fellow British agent, Cornaz, who is posing as an antique dealer.

In 1941 Schottland passes on information that Germany is about to invade the Soviet Union. Captain Reinisch, a Gestapo agent and Schottland's suspicious aide, discovers that Schottland has changed his original name and is of British ancestry. However, his superiors already know about Schottland's past and scoff at the possibility that he is a spy. To deflect suspicion and boost his own credibility as a loyal Nazi, Schottland claims at a staff meeting that "defeatists" inside the German high command have leaked military information to the enemy.

Cornaz is arrested after their courier to the British is intercepted. Schottland, as a customer at the antique shop, is summoned to headquarters for questioning. There Schottland is forced to watch as Gestapo officer Müller tortures Cornaz in a scene in which a fire hose is used to force water into Cornaz's bowels. This kills him, so there is little actual evidence to incriminate Schottland. Though he is arrested, the General is soon released on the intervention of a high-ranking Nazi, Ernst Kaltenbrunner, who had been convinced of his sincerity when Schottland seemingly damaged his own position with his accusation of defeatism among the General Staff.

Cornaz's replacement as a relayer of military information to the British is the attractive singer Lili Geyr. Though drawn to each other, they agree not to get involved emotionally, but Schottland pretends to be having an affair with her while actually passing on information. The pretence further antagonizes Reinisch, who is in love with Geyr himself.

Schottland wishes to pass on news of the attempt to break through Allied lines in the Battle of the Bulge, but Geyr no longer has means of communicating the information to the British. When Schottland is ordered to the front, he drives off the main road and tries to contact the Allies via a radio transmitter, but is forced to shoot a corporal who interrupts him. Schottland returns to Berlin and, now unable to transmit vital news, decides to sabotage the German war effort by tricking Hitler into making strategic military blunders. He does this successfully by catering to Hitler's vanity and deluded sense of the realities of the military situation.

With the war nearing its end, Schottland sends Geyr to cross over to the Allies. The plan is that once safely behind the lines she is to stay there, and after the war she and Schottland will re-unite in London and live together, at last acknowledging the strength of their relationship. Geyr is intercepted by Reinisch, who follows and shoots her, in the process getting his hands on incontrovertible evidence of Schottland's involvement in giving away German military secrets. Reinisch does not immediately act on what he has learned, however. His attempt to contact his superiors in the Gestapo fails because the communication network is in chaos. When he finally confronts Schottland the next morning at Schottland's home, they fight, struggle for a dropped gun, and Schottland kills Reinisch. He then requests an immediate meeting with Hitler, where he implicates capable German generals as defeatists so that they will be relieved of their duties, and also casts suspicion on Müller, who as a result is also arrested.

Having volunteered to contact a missing general to assist in the defence of Berlin, Schottland is driven along an autobahn. Orders are received to pursue him, but he cuts across the forest towards the Allied lines. Camouflaged troops capture him, and on realising they are British his face breaks into a relieved smile.

Cast 
 Jack Hawkins as General Alex Schottland
 Gia Scala as Lili Geyr
 Erik Schumann as Captain Kurt Reinisch 
 Alexander Knox as Gestapo Leader Müller
 Felix Aylmer as Cornaz
 Walter Hudd as Admiral Canaris
 Edward Underdown as Ernst Kaltenbrunner
 Laurence Naismith as General Hauser 
 Geoffrey Bayldon as Dietz 
 Kenneth Griffith as Adolf Hitler
 Michael Caine as Gestapo Agent 
 Martin Benson as General Wagner
 Ronald Hines as German Corporal 
 Donald Pleasence as General Hardt 
 Martin Boddey as General Optiz
 Victor Woolf as Secondhand Shop Owner

Production
Lt. Col. Alexander Scotland OBE served as technical adviser to the film. Although the movie was ostensibly based on a true story, and Scotland was known as "Schottland" during his service with German forces in Africa at the turn of the century, the movie was not based on Scotland's experiences. He served during the war as commandant of "The London Cage," an MI19 facility that interrogated captured Germans.

Michael Caine appears in a bit part as a Gestapo officer, and Donald Pleasence plays a German general. Screenwriters Michael Wilson and Alfred Levitt were not given credit because of the blacklist. The credit instead was given to James O'Donnell. Their credits were restored in 1999. Dalton Trumbo, also blacklisted, was a story consultant.

References

External links
 

The Two-Headed Spy at Variety

1958 films
1950s spy films
1950s thriller drama films
British spy films
British thriller drama films
Films shot at Associated British Studios
Films directed by Andre DeToth
World War II spy films
Films with screenplays by Michael Wilson (writer)
Films set in 1939
Films about Nazi Germany
Columbia Pictures films
1958 drama films
1950s English-language films
1950s British films